Olga Kristina Hansen (born 28 February 1990) is a Faroese football midfielder who currently plays for B36 Torshavn and the Faroe Islands women's national football team.

Honours 

KÍ
1. deild kvinnur: 2014, 2015, 2016
Steypakappingin kvinnur: 2014, 2015, 2016

References 

1990 births
Living people
Faroese women's footballers
Faroe Islands women's international footballers
Women's association football midfielders
Ballerup-Skovlunde Fodbold (women) players